Takabayashi (written: 高林 lit. "high forest") is a Japanese surname. Notable people with the surname include:

, Japanese Noh actor
, Japanese speed skater
, Japanese footballer
, Japanese baseball player
, Japanese footballer
, Japanese film director
, Japanese footballer

Japanese-language surnames